Lisa Raymond and Samantha Stosur were the defending champions, but withdrew due to a viral illness for Stosur, before their quarterfinal against Jarmila Gajdošová and Akiko Morigami.

Nicole Pratt and Bryanne Stewart won in the final 7–5, 4–6, 10–5, against Jarmila Gajdošová and Akiko Morigami.

Seeds

  Lisa Raymond /  Samantha Stosur (quarterfinals, withdrew due to a viral illness for Stosur)
  Vania King /  Shahar Pe'er (first round)
  Bethanie Mattek /  Meilen Tu (semifinals)
  Nicole Pratt /  Bryanne Stewart (champions)

Draw

Draw

External links
Draw

2007 Regions Morgan Keegan Championships and the Cellular South Cup
Cellular South Cup